The 2018 Chicago White Sox season was the club's 119th season in Chicago and 118th in the American League. It marked the second season with Rick Renteria as manager of the Sox. The Sox played their home games at Guaranteed Rate Field. After losing to the Red Sox on August 30 they clinched their 6th consecutive losing season and their 11th year without a postseason spot. They began their season on March 29 against the Kansas City Royals and finished the season on September 30 against the Minnesota Twins.

At 62-100, the White Sox finished four games ahead of the last-place Royals, had the 3rd worst record in the league, and 29 games behind the Cleveland Indians; it was their first 100-loss season since 1970.

It was the final season for long time PBP announcer Ken Harrelson who retired before the end of the season, and the second of the last for broadcasts on long time FTA broadcaster WGN-TV, the 2018-19 offseason was when it was announced that NBC Sports Chicago, the team's cable partner, will become the de facto official station of the team effective Opening Day 2020 with more game broadcasts there. No plans are yet to be made regarding the team's future free-to-air television broadcasts, through.

Offseason

Transactions 

 October 2, 2017, Cody Asche and Jean Machi granted free agency.
 October 6, 2017, Rob Brantly granted free agency.
 October 7, 2017, David Holmberg granted free agency.
 October 9, 2017, Rymer Liriano and Chris Volstad granted free agency.
 November 2, 2017, Mike Pelfrey and Geovany Soto granted free agency.
 November 3, 2017, White Sox acquired outfielder Daniel Palka off waivers from the Minnesota Twins.
 November 6, 2017. Jason Bourgeois, Steve Johnson, Tyler Ladendorf, Matt Purke and Scott Snodgress granted free agency.
 November 16, 2017, White Sox traded international bonus slot money to the Seattle Mariners for pitcher Thyago Vieira.
 November 18, 2017, White Sox signed pitcher Dustin Antolin as a free agent.
 December 1, 2017, White Sox signed free agent catcher Welington Castillo to a two-year, $15 million contract, including a club option for 2020. Al Alburquerque, Alen Hanson, Jake Petricka and Zach Putnam granted free agency.
 December 22, 2017, White Sox selected pitcher José Ruiz off of waivers from the San Diego Padres.
 January 4, 2018, as part of a 3-team trade, White Sox traded infielder Jake Peter (minors) to the Los Angeles Dodgers. The Sox received relief pitcher Luis Avilán and cash from the Los Angeles Dodgers and relief pitcher Joakim Soria and cash from the Kansas City Royals. In addition, the Los Angeles Dodgers sent infielder Erick Mejia (minors) and pitcher Trevor Oaks (minors) to the Kansas City Royals; and the Kansas City Royals sent pitcher Scott Alexander to the Los Angeles Dodgers.
 January 10, 2018, White Sox acquire minor league infielder José Rondón via trade from the San Diego Padres for cash.
 January 11, 2018, White Sox re-acquired pitcher Miguel González via free agency for a one-year deal.Outfielder Jacob May was designated for assignment. 
 January 16, 2018, White Sox signed pitcher Gonzalez Germen to a minor league contract.
 January 22, 2018, White Sox signed pitchers TJ House, Rob Scahill and Chris Volstad as free agents.
 January 24, 2018, pitcher Donn Roach was signed as a free agent.
 January 25, 2018, White Sox signed pitcher Xavier Cedeño to a minor league contract.
 January 29, 2018, infielder Dean Anna was signed as a free agent.
 January 31, 2018, pitcher Jeanmar Gómez was signed as a free agent.
 February 8, 2018, signed infielder Jake Elmore and pitcher Bruce Rondón as free agents.
 February 14, 2018, pitcher Hector Santiago was signed as a free agent to a minor league contract.

Source

Spring training

Transactions 

 March 4, 2018, White Sox signed pitcher Robbie Ross Jr. as a free agent.
 March 9, 2018, White Sox released Willy García.

Spring training game log

|- style="background:#fbb"
| 1 || February 23 || @ Dodgers || 2:05pm || 5–13 || Lee (1–0) || Danish (0–1) || – || 0–1 || 6,813 || L1
|- style="background:#bfb"
| 2 || February 24 || @ Mariners # || 2:10pm || 5–3 || Gómez (1–0) || Morin (0–1) || Volstad (1) || 1–1 || 5,107 || W1
|- style="background:#bfb"
| 3 || February 25 || Reds (SS) || 2:05pm || 8–5 || Scahill (1–0) || Worley (0–1) || Walsh (1) || 2–1 || 2,703 || W2
|- style="background:#bfb"
| 4 || February 26 || Athletics || 2:05pm || 7–6 || Kopech (1–0) || Graveman (0–1) || Danish (1) || 3–1 || 2,826 || W3
|- style="background:#fbb"
| 5 || February 27 || @ Cubs || 2:05pm || 5–6 || Lester (1–0) || Fulmer (0–1) || De La Cruz (1) || 3–2 || 10,769 || L1
|- style="background:#bfb"
| 6 || February 28 || Rangers || 2:05pm || 5–4 || Cease (1–0) || Sampson (0–1) || – || 4–2 || 2,360 || W1
|-

|- style="background:#fbb"
| 7 || March 1 || @ Reds || 2:05pm || 7–8 || Worley (1–1) || Ruiz (0–1) || – || 4–3 || 2,271 || L1
|- style="background:#fbb"
| 8 || March 2 || Dodgers # || 2:05pm || 6–7 || Copping (1–0) || Walsh (0–1) || Istler (1) || 4–4 || 7,423 || L2
|- style="background:#bfb"
| 9 || March 3 || @ Royals # || 2:05pm || 9–5 || Scahill (2–0) || Flynn (1–1) || Stephens (1) || 5–4 || 5,793 || W1
|- style="background:#fbb"
| 10 || March 4 || Padres (SS) || 2:05pm || 6–7 || Lucchesi (1–0) || Fulmer (0–2) || Aro (1) || 5–5 || 3,777 || L1
|- style="background:#bbb"
| 11 || March 5 || @ Athletics # || 2:05pm || 9–9 || – || – || – || 5–5 || 4,302 || T1
|- style="background:#bfb"
| 12 || March 6 || Brewers || 2:05pm || 6–4 || Dunning (1–0) || Williams (0–1) || Clark (1) || 6–5 || 3,954 || W1
|- style="background:#bfb"
| 13 || March 7 || Reds || 2:05pm || 14–12 || Jones (1–0) || Stephens (0–1) || Goldberg (1) || 7–5 || 3,586 || W2
|- style="background:#fbb"
| 14 || March 8 || @ Rangers || 2:05pm || 4–5 || Barnette (2–0) || Stephens (0–1) || Scott (1) || 7–6 || 3,739 || L1
|- style="background:#fbb"
| 15 || March 8 || Royals || 2:05pm || 0–12 || Duffy (1–0) || Kopech (1–1) || – || 7–7 || 3,419 || L2
|- style="background:#fbb"
| 16 || March 9 || @ Padres || 2:10pm || 0–2 || Richard (1–1) || Fulmer (0–3) || Makita (1) || 7–8 || 5,331 || L3
|- style="background:#bbb"
| 17 || March 10 || @ Cubs (SS) || 2:05pm || 4–4 || – || – || – || 7–8 || 15,508 || T1
|- style="background:#bfb"
| 18 || March 11 || Diamondbacks || 3:05pm || 6–5 || López (1–0) || Corbin (0–1) || Clark (2) || 8–8 || 7,289 || W1
|- style="background:#bfb"
| 19 || March 12 || @ Mariners || 8:40pm || 4–2 || Cease (2–0) || Gonzales (0–1) || Clarkin (1) || 9–8 || 7,287 || W2
|- style="background:#fbb"
| 20 || March 14 || @ Brewers || 3:05pm || 3–11 || Chacín (2–1) || Fulmer (0–4) || – || 9–9 || 5,497 || L1
|- style="background:#bfb"
| 21 || March 15 || @ Angels (SS) # || 8:10pm || 7–2 || Giolito (1–0) || Bridwell (0–1) || – || 10–9 || 6,083 || W1
|- style="background:#fbb"
| 22 || March 16 || Cubs || 3:05pm || 3–6 || Darvish (2–0) || López (1–1) || Hancock (2) || 10–10 || 13,044 || L1
|- style="background:#bfb"
| 23 || March 17 || Dodgers # || 3:05pm || 5–2 || González (1–0) || Ryu (1–1) || Scahill (1) || 11–10 || 13,199 || W1
|- style="background:#fbb"
| 24 || March 18 || @ Athletics # || 3:05pm || 0–14 || Luzardo (1–0) || Shields (0–1) || – || 11–11 || 6,227 || L1
|- style="background:#bfb"
| 25 || March 19 || @ Diamondbacks || 3:10pm || 15–2 || Fulmer (1–4) || Suárez (1–1) || – || 12–11 || 10,299 || W1
|- style="background:#bfb"
| 26 || March 20 || Rangers || 3:05pm || 10–0 || Giolito (2–0) || Fister (0–1) || – || 13–11 || 4,561 || W2
|- style="background:#fbb"
| 27 || March 21 || Padres || 3:05pm || 3–4 || Perdomo (1–2) || López (1–2) || Maton (2) || 13–12 || 4,727 || L1
|- style="background:#bfb"
| 28 || March 22 || @ Diamondbacks || 8:40pm || 3–1 || González (2–0) ||Walker (1–1) || Ross Jr. (1) || 14–12 || 8,576 || W1
|- style="background:#bbb"
| 29 || March 23 || Mariners # || 3:05pm || 5–5 || – || – || – || 14–12 || 6,173 || T1
|- style="background:#bfb"
| 30 || March 24 || @ Dodgers # || 2:05pm || 7–3 || Santiago (1–0) || Wood (2–1) || – || 15–12 || 13,160 || W1
|- style="background:#bfb"
| 31 || March 25 || Brewers || 2:05pm || 16–1 || Volstad (1–0) || Ramirez (0–1) || – || 16–12 || 7,437 || W2
|- style="background:#bfb"
| 32 || March 26 || @ Knights || 5:05pm || 9–5 || López (2–2) || Roach (0–1) || – || 17–12 || 7,237 || W3
|-

|- style="text-align:center;"
| Legend:       = Win       = Loss       = Cancelled/TieBold = White Sox team member, SS=Spilt Squad #=Game Was Not Televised In the Chicago Market

Regular season

Highlights 

 March 28, 2018: White Sox trade international bonus slot money to the Philadelphia Phillies for pitcher Ricardo Pinto. Sold Dean Anna to the Philadelphia Phillies.
 April 9, 2018: A reported 947 people attended the White Sox home game against the Tampa Bay Rays, which was played in cold weather, although the paid attendance announced during the game was 10,377.
 April 19, 2018: White Sox sold Tyler Saladino to the Milwaukee Brewers and traded a player to be named or cash to the Oakland Athletics for Trayce Thompson.
 April 27, 2018: The Sox traded a player to be named to the Pittsburgh Pirates and received Todd Cunningham.
 May 10, 2018: Sox Release Jorge Rondón.
 May 12, 2018: White Sox sign Johnny Giavotella as a free agent.
 May 15, 2018: Sox release Todd Cunningham.
 May 20, 2018: White Sox sign Michael Saunders as a free agent.
 May 23, 2018: White Sox sign Alex Presley as a free agent.
 May 24, 2018: Sox catcher Welington Castillo was suspended for 80 games for violating the league's performance-enhancing drug policy. White Sox select Dustin Garneau off waivers from the Oakland Athletics.
 May 28, 2018: Sox sign Jairo Labourt as a free agent.
 June 3, 2018: White Sox sell Brad Goldberg to the Arizona Diamondbacks.
 June 9. 2018: Sox release Robbie Ross Jr.
 June 12, 2018: White Sox release TJ House.
 June 13, 2018: Chris Beck was claimed off waivers by the New York Mets.
 June 21, 2018: Sox release Michael Saunders.
 June 22, 2018: Sox release Johnny Giavotella.
 June 29, 2018: Sox release Alex Presley.
 June 30, 2018: Sox release Jairo Labourt.
 July 5, 2018: Sox release Donn Roach.
 July 9, 2018: White Sox claim Ryan LaMarre off waivers from the Minnesota Twins.
 July 17, 2018: Bruce Rondón is granted free agency.
 July 20, 2018: Sox sign Mauricio Cabrera as a free agent.
 July 25, 2018: Sox sign Asher Wojciechowski as a free agent.
 July 26, 2018: White Sox trade Joakim Soria and cash to the Milwaukee Brewers for Kodi Medeiros (minors) and Wilber Perez (minors).
 July 28, 2018: Sox release Jacob May.
 July 31, 2018: Sox release Chris Volstad.

Season standings

American League Central

American League Wild Card

Record against opponents

Game log

|-style="background:#bfb
| 1 || March 29 || @ Royals || 3:15pm || 14–7 || Shields (1–0) || Duffy (0–1) || — || 1–0 || 36,517 || W1
|-style="background:#bfb
| 2 || March 31 || @ Royals || 6:15pm || 4–3 || Farquhar (1–0) || Maurer (0–1) || Soria (1) || 2–0 || 17,564 || W2
|-

|-style="background:#bbb
| – || April 1 || @ Royals || 1:15pm || colspan="7" | Postponed (cold) (Rescheduled for April 28)
|-style="background:#fbb
| 3 || April 2 || @ Blue Jays || 6:07pm || 2–4 || Oh (1–0) || Farquhar (0–1) || Osuna (2) || 2–1 || 16,629 || L1
|-style="background:#fbb
| 4 || April 3 || @ Blue Jays || 6:07pm || 5–14 || Happ (1–1) || González (0–1) || — || 2–2 || 17,451 || L2 
|-style="background:#bfb
| 5 || April 4 || @ Blue Jays || 6:07pm || 4–3 || Jones (1–0) || Tepera (1–1) || Soria (2) || 3–2 || 17,268 || W1
|-style="background:#fbb
| 6 || April 5 || Tigers || 3:10pm || 7–9 (10) || Jiménez (1–0) || Infante (0–1) || Greene (1) || 3–3 || 33,318 || L1
|-style="background:#fbb
| 7 || April 7 || Tigers || 1:10pm || 1–6 || Fulmer (1–1) || Giolito (0–1) || — || 3–4 || 16,625 || L2
|-style="background:#fbb
| 8 || April 8 || Tigers || 1:10pm || 0–1 || Fiers (1–0) || López (0–1) || Greene (2) || 3–5 || 11,131 || L3
|-style="background:#fbb
| 9 || April 9 || Rays || 1:10pm || 4–5 || Archer (1–0) || González (0–2) || Colomé (2) || 3–6 || 10,377 || L4
|-style="background:#fbb
| 10 || April 10 || Rays || 1:10pm || 5–6 || Snell (1–1) || Fulmer (0–1) || Colomé (3) || 3–7 || 10,069 || L5
|-style="background:#bfb
| 11 || April 11 || Rays || 1:10pm || 2–1 || Rondón (1–0) || Pruitt (1–1) || Jones (1) || 4–7 || 10,431 || W1
|-style="background:#fbb
| 12 || April 12 || @ Twins || 7:10pm || 0–4 || Berríos (2–1) || Giolito (0–2) || — || 4–8 || 15,474 || L1
|-style="background:#bbb
| – || April 13 || @ Twins || 7:10pm || colspan="7" | Postponed (inclement weather) (rescheduled for June 5)
|-style="background:#bbb
| – || April 14 || @ Twins || 1:10pm || colspan="7" | Postponed (snow) (rescheduled for September 28) 
|-style="background:#bbb
| – || April 15 || @ Twins || 1:10pm || colspan="7" | Postponed (snow) (rescheduled for August 20)  
|-style="background:#fbb
| 13 || April 16 || @ Athletics || 9:05pm || 1–8 || Mengden (2–2) || López (0–2)  || — || 4–9 || 7,479 || L2
|-style="background:#fbb
| 14 || April 17 || @ Athletics || 9:05pm || 2–10 || Cahill (1–0) || González (0–3) || — || 4–10 || 46,028 || L3
|-style="background:#fbb
| 15 || April 18 || @ Athletics || 2:35pm || 11–12 (14) || Trivino (1–0) || Shields (1–1) || — || 4–11 || 13,321 || L4
|-style="background:#fbb
| 16 || April 20 || Astros || 7:10pm || 0–10 || Verlander (3–0) || Shields (1–2) || — || 4–12 || 14,211 || L5
|-style="background:#fbb
| 17 || April 21 || Astros || 6:10pm || 1–10 || Keuchel (1–3) || Giolito (0–3) || — || 4–13 || 23,902 || L6
|-style="background:#fbb
| 18 || April 22 || Astros || 1:10pm || 1–7 || McCullers Jr. (3–1) || Bummer (0–1) || — || 4–14 || 17,167 || L7
|-style="background:#bfb
| 19 || April 23 || Mariners || 7:10pm || 10–4 || Fulmer (1–1) || Leake (2–2) || Beck (1) || 5–14 || 13,614 || W1
|-style="background:#fbb
| 20 || April 24 || Mariners || 4:10pm || 0–1 || Gonzales (2–2) || Volstad (0–1) || Díaz (9) || 5–15 || 10,761 || L1
|-style="background:#fbb
| 21 || April 25 || Mariners || 1:10pm || 3–4 || Hernández (3–2) || Shields (1–3) || Díaz (10) || 5–16 || 11,417 || L2
|-style="background:#bfb
| 22 || April 26 || @ Royals || 7:15pm || 6–3 || Giolito (1–3) || Junis (3–2) || Soria (3) || 6–16 || 18,315 || W1
|-style="background:#bfb
| 23 || April 27 || @ Royals || 7:15pm || 7–4 (11) || Infante (1–1) || Hill (0–1) || Soria (4) || 7–16 || 15,395 || W2
|-style="background:#bfb
| 24 || April 28 || @ Royals || 1:15pm || 8–0 || Fulmer (2–1) || Oaks (0–1) || — || 8–16 || 16,971 || W3
|-style="background:#fbb
| 25 || April 28 || @ Royals || 7:15pm || 2–5 || Skoglund (1–2) || Covey (0–1) || Herrera (5) || 8–17 || 16,070 || L1
|-style="background:#fbb
| 26 || April 29 || @ Royals || 1:15pm || 4–5 || McCarthy (2–0) || Rondón (1–1) || Boyer (1) || 8–18 || 23,892 || L2  
|-

|-style="background:#fbb
| 27 || May 1 || @ Cardinals || 7:15pm || 2–3 || Norris (1–0) || Soria (0–1) || — || 8–19 || 38,800 || L3
|-style="background:#fbb
| 28 || May 2 || @ Cardinals || 12:15pm || 2–3 || Martínez (3–1) || Giolito (1–4) || Norris (6) || 8–20 || 37,298 || L4
|-style="background:#bfb
| 29 || May 3 || Twins || 7:10pm || 6–5 || Jones (2–0) || Reed (0–2) || — || 9–20 || 13,260 || W1
|-style="background:#fbb
| 30 || May 4 || Twins || 7:10pm || 4–6
|| Berrios (3-3) || Fulmer (2-2) || Rodney (4)|| 9–21 || 15,935 ||L1
|-style="background:#fbb
| 31 || May 5 || Twins || 6:10pm || 4–8 || Lynn (1-3)|| Santiago (0-1)|| — ||9–22||23,765||L2
|-style="background:#fbb
| 32 || May 6 || Twins || 1:10pm ||| 3–5 || Duke (2-1)|| Rondón (1-2) || Rodney (5) ||9–23||17,424||L3
|-style="background:#fbb
| 33 || May 8 || Pirates || 7:10pm || 6–10|| Glasnow (1-1)
| Volstad (0-2) || — || 9–24 || 12,871 || L4
|-style="background:#fbb
| 34 || May 9 || Pirates || 1:10pm || 5–6
|Rodriguez (1-1)||Jones (2-1) || Vasquez (7) || 9–25 || 12,476 || L5
|-style="background:#fbb
| 35 || May 11 || @ Cubs || 1:20pm || 2–11 || Chatwood (3-3)|| Fulmer (2-3) || — || 9–26 || 39,585 || L6
|-style="background:#fbb
| 36 || May 12 || @ Cubs || 1:20pm ||4–8||Lester (3-1)||Shields (1-4)||Morrow (9)|| 9–27 || 41,099 || L7
|-style="background:#bfb
| 37 || May 13 || @ Cubs || 1:20pm ||5–3||Giolito (2–4)||Hendricks (3–3)||Rondón (1)||10–27||40,537||W1
|-style="background:#fbb
| 38 || May 15 || @ Pirates || 6:05pm || 0–7 || Williams (5–2) || López (0–3)  ||  — || 10–28 || 11,847 || L1
|-style="background:#fbb
| 39 || May 16 || @ Pirates || 11:35am || 2–3 || Santana (1–0) || Soria (0–2) || Vázquez (8) || 10–29 || 20,286 || L2
|-style="background:#bfb
| 40 || May 17 || Rangers || 7:10pm || 4–2 || Avilán (1–0)  || Leclerc (1–1) || Jones (2) || 11–29 || 17,666 || W1
|-style="background:#fbb
| 41 || May 18 || Rangers || 7:10pm || 5–12 || Chavez (2–0) || Fulmer (2–4) ||  — ||  11–30 ||  16,373 || L1
|-style="background:#bfb
| 42 || May 19 || Rangers || 6:10pm || 5–3 ||  Giolito (3–4) || Jurado (0–1) || Jones (3) || 12–30 || 25,611 || W1
|-style="background:#bfb
| 43 || May 20 || Rangers || 1:10pm || 3–0 || López (1–3) || Minor (3–3) || Fry (1) || 13–30 || 16,829 || W2
|-style="background:#fbb
| 44 || May 21 || Orioles || 7:10pm || 2–3 || Cashner (2–5) || Santiago (0–2) || Brach (7) || 13–31 || 11,628 || L1
|-style="background:#bfb
| 45 || May 22 || Orioles || 7:10pm || 3–2 || Rondón (2–2) || Givens (0–1) || Jones (4) || 14–31 || 12,590 || W1
|-style="background:#bfb
| 46 || May 23 || Orioles || 7:10pm || 11–1 || Covey (1–1) || Cobb (1–6) || — || 15–31 || 17,056 || W2
|-style="background:#fbb
| 47 || May 24 || Orioles || 1:10pm || 3–9 || Bundy (3–6) || Giolito (3–5) || — || 15–32 || 19,147 || L1
|-style="background:#fbb
| 48 || May 25 || @ Tigers || 6:10pm || 4–5 || Farmer (1–3) || Rondón (2–3) || Greene (12) || 15–33 || 24,648 || L2
|-style="background:#bfb
| 49 || May 26 || @ Tigers || 3:10pm|| 8–4 || Santiago (1–2) || Liriano (3–2) || — || 16–33 || 27,032 || W1
|-style="background:#fbb
| 50 || May 27 || @ Tigers || 12:10pm || 2–3 || Hardy (1–0) || Shields (1–5) || Greene (13) || 16–34 || 23,419 || L1
|-style="background:#fbb
| 51 || May 28 || @ Indians || 3:10pm || 6–9 || Plutko (3–0) || Volstad (0–3) || — || 16–35 || 23,729 || L2
|-style="background:#fbb
| 52 || May 29 || @ Indians || 5:10pm || 3–7 || Clevinger (4–2) || Giolito (3–6) || — || 16–36 || 30,441 || L3
|-style="background:#fbb
| 53 || May 30 || @ Indians || 12:10pm || 1–9 || Kluber (8–2) || López (1–4) || — || 16–37 || 17,930 || L4
|-

|-style="background:#bfb
| 54 || June 1 || Brewers || 7:10pm || 8-3 || Avilán (2–0) || Anderson (4-4) || — || 17-37 || 20,004 || W1
|-style="background:#fbb
| 55 || June 2 || Brewers || 1:10pm || 0-5 || Chacín (4-1) || Shields (1–6) || — || 17-38 || 29,281 || L1
|-style="background:#bfb
| 56 || June 3 || Brewers || 1:10pm || 6-1 || Volstad (1-3) || Suter (5-4) || — || 18-38 || 25,338 || W1
|-style="background:#fbb
| 57 || June 5 || @ Twins || 3:10pm || 2-4 || Duffey (1-1) || Jones (2–2) || Rodney (13) || 18-39 || 26,261 || L1
|-style="background:#bfb
| 58 || June 5 || @ Twins || Game 2 || 6-3 || Giolito (4-6) || Littell (0-1) || Soria (5) || 19-39 || 26,261 || W1
|-style="background:#bfb
| 59 || June 6 || @ Twins || 7:10pm || 5-2 || Santiago (2–2) || Odorizzi (3-3) || Soria (6) || 20-39 || 20,393 || W2
|-style="background:#fbb
| 60 || June 7 || @ Twins || 12:10pm || 2-7 || Berríos (7-5) || Shields (1–7) || — || 20-40 || 21,469 || L1
|-style="background:#bfb
| 61 || June 8 || @ Red Sox || 6:10pm || 1-0 || Covey (2-1) || Sale (5-4) || Soria (7) || 21-40 || 36,593 || W1
|-style="background:#fbb
| 62 || June 9 || @ Red Sox || 3:05pm || 2-4 || Price (7-4) || Rodon (0-1) || Kimbrel (20) || 21-41 || 36,675 || L1
|-style="background:#bfb
| 63 || June 10 || @ Red Sox || 12:05pm || 5-2 || López (2–4) || Porcello (8-3) || — || 22-41 || 36,998 || W1
|-style="background:#fbb
| 64 || June 11 || Indians || 7:10pm || 0-4 || Carrasco (8-4) || Giolito (4-7) || — || 22-42 || 13,125 || L1
|-style="background:#bfb
| 65 || June 12 || Indians || 7:10pm || 5-1 || Shields (2-7) || Plutko (3-1) || Soria (9) || 23-42 || 12,357 || W1
|-style="background:#bfb
| 66 || June 13 || Indians || 7:10pm || 3-2 || Covey (3-1) || Bauer (5-5) || Soria (10) || 24-42 || 19,390 || W2
|-style="background:#fbb
| 67 || June 14 || Indians || 1:10pm || 2-5 || Clevinger (5-2) || Volstad (1-4) || Allen (13) || 24-43 || 17,183 || L1
|-style="background:#fbb
| 68 || June 15 || Tigers || 7:10pm || 3-4 || Farmer (2–3) || Minaya (0–1) || Greene (18) || 24-44 || 22,813 || L2
|-style="background:#fbb
| 69 || June 16 || Tigers || 1:10pm || 5-7 || Farmer (3–3) || Fry (0–1) || Greene (19) || 24-45 || 23,195 || L3
|-style="background:#fbb
| 70 || June 17 || Tigers || 1:10pm || 3–1 || Hardy (3-1) || Shields (2–8) || Jiménez (2) || 24-46 || 26,746 || L4
|-style="background:#fbb
| 71 || June 18 || @ Indians || 6:10pm || 2–6 || Bauer (6-5)  || Covey (3-2) || — || 24-47 || 17,271 || L5
|-style="background:#fbb
| 72 || June 19 || @  Indians || 6:10pm || 3–6 || Clevinger (6-2) || Rodon (0-2) || Allen (15) || 24-48 || 20,394 || L6
|-style="background:#fbb
| 73 || June 20 || @ Indians || 12:10pm || 0–12 || Kluber (11-3) || López (2-5) || — || 24-49 || 23,101 || L7
|-style="background:#bbb
| – || June 21 || Athletics || 7:10pm || colspan="7" | Postponed (rain) (Rescheduled for June 22 as part of a doubleheader) 
|-style="background:#fbb
| 74 || June 22 || Athletics || 3:10pm || 2–11  || Manaea (7–6) || Shields (2–9) || — || 24-50 || 18,323 || L8
|-style="background:#bfb
| 75 || June 22 || Athletics || Game 2 || 6–4  || Giolito (5–7) || Bassitt (0–3) ||Soria (11) || 25-50 || 18,323 || W1
|-style="background:#fbb
| 76 || June 23 || Athletics || 1:10pm || 6–7 || Trivino (5–1) || Minaya || Treinen (17) || 25-51 ||20,457  || L1
|-style="background:#bfb
| 77 || June 24 || Athletics || 1:10pm || 10–3 || Rodon (1–2) || Blackburn || — || 26-51 || 21,908 || W1
|-style="background:#bfb
| 78 || June 26 || Twins || 7:10pm || 8–4 ||López (3–5) || Lynn (5–6) || — || 27–51 || 16,276 || W2
|-style="background:#bfb
| 79 || June 27 || Twins || 7:10pm || 6–1  ||Shields (3–9) || Gibson (2–6) || — || 28–51 || 19,466 || W3
|-style="background:#fbb
| 80 || June 28 || Twins || 1:10pm || 1–2 (13)  || Busenitz (2–0) || Santiago (2–3) || — || 28–52 || 21,610 || L1
|-style="background:#fbb
| 81 || June 29 || @ Rangers || 7:05pm || 3–11 || Gallardo (2–0) || Covey (3–3)  || — || 28–53 ||28,156 || L2
|-style="background:#fbb
| 82 || June 30 || @ Rangers || 8:05pm || 4–13  || Colón (5–5) || Rodon (1–3) || — || 28–54 || 28,138 || L3
|-

|-style="background:#bfb
| 83 || July 1 || @ Rangers || 2:05pm || 10–5 || López (4–5) || Hamels (4–7) || Soria (12) || 29–54 || 22,684 || W1
|-style="background:#fbb
| 84 || July 2 || @ Reds || 6:10pm || 3–5 || Floro (3–2) || Volstad (1–5) || Iglesias (16) || 29–55 || 16,727 || L1
|-style="background:#bfb
| 85 || July 3 || @ Reds || 6:10pm || 12–8 (12) || Santiago (3–3) ||Stephens (2–1) || — || 30–55 || 22,742 ||W1
|-style="background:#fbb
| 86 || July 4 || @ Reds || 6:10pm || 4–7 || Romano (5–8) || Covey (3–4) || Hughes (6) || 30–56 || 24,442 || L1
|-style="background:#fbb
| 87 || July 5 || @ Astros || 7:10pm || 3–4 || Smith (3–1) || Soria (0–3) || — || 30–57 || 34,955 || L2
|-style="background:#fbb
| 88 || July 6 || @ Astros || 7:10pm || 4–11 || McCullers Jr. (10–3) || López (4–6) || Peacock (2) || 30–58 || 38,153 || L3
|-style="background:#fbb
| 89 || July 7 || @ Astros || 3:10pm || 6–12 || Morton (11–2) || Shields (3–10) || — || 30–59 || 39,568 || L4
|-style="background:#fbb
| 90 || July 8 || @ Astros || 1:10pm || 1–2 || Keuchel (6–8) || Giolito (5–8) || Rondón (7) || 30–60 || 41,654 || L5
|-style="background:#fbb
| 91 || July 10 || Cardinals || 7:10pm || 2–14 || Mikolas (10–3) || Covey (3–5) || — || 30–61 || 23,245 ||L6
|-style="background:#bfb
| 92 || July 11 || Cardinals || 7:10pm || 4–0 || Rodon (2–3) || Weaver (5–8) || Soria (13) || 31–61 || 26,319 ||W1
|-style="background:#bfb
| 93 || July 13 || Royals || 7:10pm || 9–6 || Shields (4–10) || Keller (2–4) || Soria (14) || 32–61 || 19,361 ||W2
|-style="background:#fbb
| 94 || July 14 || Royals || 1:10pm || 0–5 || Duffy (5–8) || López (4–7) || — || 32–62 || 20,159 ||L1
|-style="background:#bfb
| 95 || July 15 || Royals || 1:10pm || 10–1 || Giolito (6–8) || Smith (0–1) || — || 33–62 || 23,434 || W1
|-style="background:
|- style="text-align:center; background:#bbcaff;"
| colspan="11" | 89th All-Star Game in Washington, D.C.
|-style="background:#fbb
| 96 || July 20 || @ Mariners || 9:10pm || 1–3 || LeBlanc (6–1) || Shields (4–11) || Díaz (37) || 33–63 || 43,331 ||L1
|-style="background:#bfb
| 97 || July 21 || @ Mariners || 9:10pm || 5–0 || Covey (4–5) || Hernández (8–8) || — || 34–63 || 38,186 ||W1
|-style="background:#fbb
| 98 || July 22 || @ Mariners || 3:10pm || 2–8 || Gonzales (11–5) || López (4–8) || — || 34–64 || 38,207 ||L1
|-style="background:#bfb
| 99 || July 23 || @ Angels || 9:07pm || 5–3 || Giolito (7–8) || Barría (5–7) || Soria (15) || 35–64 || 35,285 || W1
|-style="background:#bfb
| 100 || July 24 || @ Angels || 9:07pm || 4–2 || Rodon (3–3) || Pena (1–1) || Soria (16) || 36–64 || 39,937 || W2
|-style="background:#fbb
| 101 || July 25 || @ Angels || 9:07pm || 3–11 || Skaggs (8–6) || Shields (4–12) || — || 36–65 || 34,321 || L1
|-style="background:#fbb
| 102 || July 26 || @ Angels || 3:07pm || 8–12 || Tropeano (4–5) || Covey (4–6) || — || 36–66 || 33,826 || L2
|-style="background:#fbb
| 103 || July 27 || Blue Jays || 7:10pm || 5-10 || Stroman (4-7) || López (4-9)  || — || 36–67 || 20,524 || L3
|-style="background:#bfb
| 104 || July 28 || Blue Jays || 6:10pm || 9-5 || Minaya (1-2) || Tepera (5-4) || — || 37-67 || 29,442 || W1
|-style="background:#fbb
| 105 || July 29 || Blue Jays || 1:10pm || 4-7 || Santos (1-1) || Fry (0-2) || — || 37–68 || 23,836 || L1
|-style="background:#fbb
| 106 || July 31 || Royals || 7:10pm || 2-4 || Duffy (7-9) || Shields (4-13) || Peralta (6) || 37–69 || 15,250 || L2
|-

|-style="background:#fbb
| 107 || August 1 || Royals || 7:10pm || 5–10 || Junis (6–11) || Covey (4–7) || — || 37–70 || 18,019 || L3
|-style="background:#bfb
| 108 || August 2 || Royals || 1:10pm || 6–4 || Cedeño (1–0) || Adam (0–3) || Avilán (1) || 38–70 || 19,682 || W1
|-style="background:#bfb
| 109 || August 3 || @ Rays || 6:10pm || 3–2 (10) || Danish (1–0) || Alvarado (1–4) || Santiago (1) || 39–70 || 16,144 || W2
|-style="background:#bfb
| 110 || August 4 || @ Rays || 5:10pm || 2–1 || Cedeño (2–0) || Chirinos (0–4) || Vieira (1) || 40–70 || 21,214 || W3
|-style="background:#bfb
| 111 || August 5 || @ Rays || 12:10pm || 8–7 || Santiago (4–3) || Castillo (2–2) || — || 41–70 || 14,379 || W4
|-style="background:#fbb
| 112 || August 6 || Yankees || 7:10pm || 0–7 || Lynn (8–8) || Covey (4–8) || — || 41–71 || 22,084 || L1
|-style="background:#fbb
| 113 || August 7 || Yankees || 7:10pm || 3–4 (13) || Gray (9–8) || Avilán (2–1) || — || 41–72 || 19,643 || L2
|-style="background:#fbb
| 114 || August 8 || Yankees || 7:10pm || 3–7 || Severino (15–5) || Giolito (7–9) || — || 41–73 || 27,038 || L3
|-style="background:#bfb
| 115 || August 10 || Indians || 7:10pm || 1–0 || Fry (1-2) || Ramirez (0-2) || — || 42–73 || 18,772 || W1
|-style="background:#fbb
| 116 || August 11 || Indians || 6:10pm || 1–3 || Bauer (12-6) || Shields (4-14) || Allen (22) || 42–74 || 28,061 || L1
|-style="background:#fbb
| 117 || August 12 || Indians || 1:10pm || 7–9 || Carrasco (14-6) || Covey (4-9) || Allen (23) || 42–75 || 23,853 || L2
|-style="background:#fbb
| 118 || August 13 || @ Tigers || 6:10pm || 5–9 || Coleman (4–1) || Gómez (0–1) || — || 42–76 || 20,964 || L3
|-style="background:#bfb
| 119 || August 14 || @ Tigers || 6:10pm || 6–3 || Giolito (8–9) || Hardy (4–5) || Cedeño (1) || 43–76 || 20,661 || W1
|-style="background:#bfb
| 120 || August 15 || @ Tigers || 12:10pm || 6–5 || Rodón (4–3) || Zimmermann (5–5) || Avilán (2) || 44–76 || 23,784 || W2
|-style="background:#bfb
| 121 || August 17 || Royals || 7:10pm || 9–3 || Shields (5-14) || Hill (1–4) || — || 45–76 || 24,556 || W3
|-style="background:#fbb
| 122 || August 18 || Royals || 6:10pm || 1–3 || Keller (6-5) || Covey (4-10) || Peralta (8) || 45–77 || 19,018 || L1
|-style="background:#bfb
| 123 || August 19 || Royals || 1:10pm || 7–6 || Santiago (5-3) || Flynn (3-4) || Fry (2) || 46–77 || 22,033 || W1
|-style="background:#bfb
| 124 || August 20 || @ Twins || 6:10pm || 8–5 || Giolito (9–9) || Gonsalves (0-1) || — || 47–77 || 23,431 || W2
|-style="background:#fbb
| 125 || August 21 || Twins || 7:10pm || 2–5 || May (2–0) || Covey (4–11) || Rogers (2) || 47–78 || 23,133 || L1
|-style="background:#bfb
| 126 || August 22 || Twins || 1:10pm || 7–3 || Rodón (5–3) || Gibson (7–10) || — || 48–78 || 15,160 || W1
|-style="background:#fbb
| 127 || August 23 || @ Tigers || 12:10pm || 2–7 || Boyd (8–11) || Shields (5–15) || — || 48–79 || 22,247 || L1
|-style="background:#bfb
| 128 || August 24 || @ Tigers || 6:10pm || 6–3 || Vieira (1–0) || Jiménez (4–3) || — || 49–79 || 23,191 || W1
|-style="background:#bfb
| 129 || August 25 || @ Tigers || 5:10pm || 6–1 || Giolito (10–9) || Carpenter (1–2) || — || 50–79 || 26,183 || W2
|-style="background:#bfb
| 130 || August 26 || @ Tigers || 12:10pm || 7–2 || Kopech (1–0) || Zimmermann (6–6) || Fry (3) || 51–79 || 34,036 || W3
|-style="background:#bfb
| 131 || August 27 || @ Yankees || 6:05pm || 6–2 || Rodón (6–3) || Tanaka (9–5) || — || 52–79 || 41,456 || W4
|-style="background:#fbb
| 132 || August 28 || @ Yankees || 6:05pm || 4–5 || Betances (3–4) || Covey (4–12) || — || 52–80 || 40,015 || L1
|-style="background:#bfb
| 133 || August 29 || @ Yankees || 6:05pm || 4–1 || López (5–9) || Sabathia (7–5) || Fry (4) || 53–80 || 40,887 || W1
|-style="background:#fbb
| 134 || August 30 || Red Sox || 7:10pm || 4–9 || Brasier (1–0) || Vieira (1–1) || — || 53–81 || 18,015 || L1
|-style="background:#bfb
| 135 || August 31 || Red Sox || 7:10pm || 6–1 || Covey (5–12) || Eovaldi (5–7) || — || 54–81 || 23,625 || W1
|-

|-style="background:#fbb
| 136 || September 1 || Red Sox || 6:10pm || 1–6 || Rodríguez (12–3) || Rodón (6–4) || — || 54–82 || 22,639 || L1
|-style="background:#bfb
| 137 || September 2 || Red Sox || 1:10pm || 8–0 || Shields (6–15) || Johnson (4–4) || — || 55–82 || 30,745 ||W1
|-style="background:#bfb
| 138 || September 3 || Tigers || 1:10pm || 4–2 || Fry (2–2) || Greene (2–6) || — || 56–82 || 15,540 || W2
|-style="background:#fbb
| 139 || September 4 || Tigers || 7:10pm || 3–8 || Liriano (4–9) || Giolito (10–10) || — || 56–83 || 13,012 || L1
|-style="background:#fbb
| 140 || September 5 || Tigers || 7:10pm || 2–10 || Zimmermann (7–6) || Kopech (1–1) || — || 56–84 || 16,036 || L2
|-style="background:#fbb
| 141 || September 7 || Angels || 7:10pm || 2–5 || Peña (2–4) || Rodón (6–5) || Buttrey (1) || 56–85 || 18,236 || L3
|-style="background:#fbb
| 142 || September 8 || Angels || 6:10pm || 3–12 || Shoemaker (2–0) || Shields (6–16) || — || 56–86 || 27,146 || L4
|-style="background:#fbb
| 143 || September 9 || Angels || 1:10pm || 0–1 || Heaney (9–9) || Hamilton (0–1) || Álvarez (1) || 56–87 || 24,020 || L5
|-style="background:#fbb
| 144 || September 10 || @ Royals || 7:15pm || 3–4 (10) || Newberry (2–0) || Gómez (0–2) || — || 56–88 || 17,809 || L6
|-style="background:#fbb
| 145 || September 11 || @ Royals || 7:15pm || 3–6 || Keller (8–6) || Covey (5–13) || Peralta (10) || 56–89 || 17,613 || L7
|-style="background:#bfb
| 146 || September 12 || @ Royals || 7:15pm || 4–2 (12) || Minaya (2–2) || Smith (1–5) || Santiago (2) || 57–89 || 17,840 || W1
|-style="background:#bfb
| 147 || September 14 || @ Orioles || 6:05pm || 8–6 || Shields (7–16) || Ortiz (0–1) || Jones (5) || 58–89 || 18,265 || W2
|-style="background:#bfb
| 148 || September 15 || @ Orioles || 6:05pm || 2–0 || López (6–9) || Ramirez (1–6) || Minaya (1) || 59–89 || 23,266 || W3
|-style="background:#fbb
| 149 || September 16 || @ Orioles || 12:05pm || 4–8 || Meisinger (1–0) || Giolito (10–11) || Fry (1) || 59–90 || 19,104 || L1
|-style="background:#fbb
| 150 || September 18 || @ Indians || 6:10pm || 3–5 || Kluber (19–7) || Rodon (6–6) || Miller (2) || 59–91 || 19,277 || L2
|-style="background:#fbb
| 151 || September 19 || @ Indians || 6:10pm || 1–4 || Pérez (1–1) || Frare (0–1) || — || 59–92 || 18,263 || L3
|-style="background:#bfb
| 152 || September 20 || @ Indians || 6:10pm || 5–4 (11) || Santiago (6–3) || Cimber (3–8) || — || 60–92 || 19,457 || W1
|-style="background:#bfb
| 153 || September 21 || Cubs || 3:10pm || 10–4 || López (7–9) || Quintana (13–11) || — || 61–92 || 34,027 || W2
|-style="background:#fbb
| 154 || September 22 || Cubs || 6:10pm || 3–8 || Lester (17–6) || Giolito (10–12) || — || 61–93 || 39,724 || L1
|-style="background:#fbb
| 155 || September 23 || Cubs || 1:10pm || 1–6 || Hendricks (13–11) || Rodon (6–7) || — || 61–94 || 39,449 || L2
|-style="background:#fbb
| 156 || September 24 || Indians || 7:10pm || 0–4 || Kluber (20–7) || Hamilton (0–2) || — || 61–95 || 18,217 || L3
|-style="background:#bfb
| 157 || September 25 || Indians || 7:10pm || 5–4 || Hamilton (1–2) || Carrasco (16–10) || — || 62–95 || 17,040 || W1
|-style="background:#fbb
| 158 || September 26 || Indians || 7:10pm || 2–10 || Bieber (11–5) || Fry (2–3) || — || 62–96 || 25,598 || L1
|-style="background:#fbb
| 159 || September 28 || @ Twins || 1:10pm || 1–2 || Berríos (12–11) || López (7–10) || May (2) || 62–97 || 20,245 || L2
|-style="background:#fbb
| 160 || September 28 || @ Twins || 7:10pm || 4–12 || Jong (1–1) || Giolito (10–13) || — || 62–98 || 28,191 || L3
|-style="background:#fbb
| 161 || September 29 || @ Twins || 6:10pm || 3–8 || Gibson (10–13) || Rodón (6–8) || — || 62–99 || 32,717 || L4
|-style="background:#fbb
| 162 || September 30 || @ Twins || 2:10pm || 4–5 || Vasquez (1–0) || Covey (5–14) || May (3) || 62–100 || 30,144 || L5
|-

|- style="text-align:center;"
| Legend:       = Win       = Loss       = PostponementBold = White Sox team member

Roster

Statistics

Batting

Players in bold are on the active roster as of the 2022 season.

Note: G = Games played; AB = At bats; R = Runs; H = Hits; 2B = Doubles; 3B = Triples; HR = Home runs; RBI = Runs batted in; SB = Stolen bases; BB = Walks; K = Strikeouts; AVG = Batting average; OBP = On-base percentage; SLG = Slugging percentage;

Pitching

Players in bold are on the active roster as of the 2022 season.

Note: W = Wins; L = Losses; ERA = Earned run average; G = Games pitched; GS = Games started; SV = Saves; IP = Innings pitched; H = Hits allowed; R = Runs allowed; ER = Earned runs allowed; BB = Walks allowed; K = Strikeouts

Farm system

References

External links
2018 Chicago White Sox at Baseball Reference
2018 Chicago White Sox season Official Site
2018 Chicago White Sox season at ESPN

Chicago White Sox seasons
Chicago White Sox
White Sox
2010s in Chicago
White Sox